Animoso was the second and final member of the  of destroyers built for the Italian  (Royal Navy) in the 1910s.

Design

They had a crew of 4 to 5 officers and 65 to 74 enlisted men. The ships were powered by two Zoelly steam turbines, with steam provided by four White-Forster water-tube boilers.

The ship carried an armament that consisted of a single  gun and four  guns, along with two  torpedo tubes. The 102 mm gun was placed on the forecastle and the two of the 76 mm guns were mounted abreast the funnels, with the remaining pair at the stern. The torpedo tubes were in single mounts, both on the centerline.

Service history
Animoso was built at the  shipyard in Livorno, and was launched on 13 July 1913.

The same destroyers, less Ardito, attempted to catch a group of five Austro-Hungarian torpedo boats on 17 November off the mouth of the Piave, but again the Austro-Hungarians retreated behind a minefield. Over the following several days, Animosa took part in several bombardment operations against Austro-Hungarian forces in northern Italy, beginning on 18 November and concluding on the 25th. She covered another such operation on 19 December.

The ship was rearmed in 1919–1920, but she saw very limited service afterward owing to a boiler explosion on 29 July 1921 that severely damaged the ship. Having determined that Animoso was not worth repairing, the navy paid off the ship and eventually struck her from the naval register on 5 April 1923 before subsequently discarding her.

Notes

References
 
 

Audace-class destroyers (1913)
1913 ships